Allans och Martins julradioshow (Allan and Martin's Christmas Radio Show) was the 2001 edition of Sveriges Radio's Christmas Calendar.

Plot
Allan starts a Christmas radio programme.

References
 

2001 radio programme debuts
2001 radio programme endings
Sveriges Radio's Christmas Calendar